Bruno Miguel Silva do Nascimento (born 12 May 1976), known as Bruno Lage, is a Portuguese football manager who most recently was the head coach of Premier League club Wolverhampton Wanderers.

During his short tenure as coach of Benfica in Portugal, he won the 2018–19 league title and the 2019 Super Cup.

Career

Early career
Born in Setúbal, Lage's father Fernando Lage Nascimento was formerly a manager in the Portuguese lower leagues. Lage started his coaching career in the youth ranks of hometown club Vitória de Setúbal in 1997. Lage was appointed as a physical/fitness coach by former Vitória and Famalicão manager Jose Rocha, of whom he was described as a protégé.

In 2004, Lage joined Benfica as a youth coach. Lage coached every youth team from 2004 to 2012. Defender João Cancelo has praised the role of Lage in his development and credited him as a father figure.

Lage later worked as an assistant coach to Carlos Carvalhal at Sheffield Wednesday and Swansea City from 2015 to 2018. Lage co-authored a book on football tactics alongside Carvahal, Soccer: Developing a Know-How (2014). Lage returned to Benfica as manager of their reserve team in July 2018 to replace Hélder Cristóvão.

Benfica

2018-19 season 
During Benfica's 2018–19 season, Lage took charge of the club's first-team as caretaker manager, replacing Rui Vitória on 3 January 2019. He managed his first Primeira Liga game in a 4–2 home win over Rio Ave on 6 January and was appointed permanent head coach eight days later. One of Lage's first decisions was to begin regularly starting teenage playmaker João Félix, who had scored twice in the triumph over Rio Ave. Upon being appointed as Benfica coach, Lage had decided to focus on developing youth and adopting an attacking style of play. He deployed a new 4-4-1-1 formation in order to play to the strengths of Felix as a shadow striker behind Haris Seferovic, giving him freedom to roam while encouraging his full-backs to attack and using technically-gifted midfielders in order to both defend and create. Lage also promoted younger players to the first-team such as Florentino and Ferro who would go on to play important roles that season.

Felix started 28 of 29 matches in all competitions under Lage, scoring 17 goals and recording 10 assists. Lage was credited with the emergence of a young player viewed as "the most exciting Portuguese player since Cristiano Ronaldo" and for building the team around Felix. Felix called Lage "the manager who put me where I am today."

On 10 February, after winning two consecutive Lisbon derbies – including a 4–2 away win in the league  – Lage led Benfica to the biggest Primeira Liga margin of victory since 1964 and to the league's highest scoring win since 1965, a 10–0 thrashing of Nacional, setting the record for the biggest win at the new Estádio da Luz. On 14 February in his UEFA Europa League debut, Benfica won in Turkey for the first time in their history, beating Galatasaray 2–1 in the first leg of the round of 32. A 0-0 draw at the Estádio da Luz sent Benfica through to the round of sixteen, where they defeated Dinamo Zagreb 3-1 on aggregate after extra-time. Benfica were eliminated from the Europa League at the quarter-finals stage by Eintracht Frankfurt on the away goals rule, having won 4-2 at home before falling to a 2-0 defeat at the Waldstadion on 18 April.

As Benfica won 2–1 away in The Classic on 2 March 2019, Lage equalled Rui Vitória's 3 wins out of 16 matches against rivals Sporting and Porto. From matchday 16 to 34, Lage won 18 league matches and drew just 1 to win his first major trophy, Benfica's 37th league title. With a 94% winning percentage, he surpassed Jimmy Hagan's record at Benfica and achieved Primeira Liga's all-time best second round: 49 points from 19 games. In addition, he equalled Sven-Göran Eriksson's 1990–91 feat of beating Porto, Sporting, and Braga away in the same season. Lage also equalled Benfica's league scoring record of 103 goals in 1963–64.

2019-20 season 
Lage then started a second season at Benfica with a 5–0 win over Sporting CP in the Super Cup.

On 17 September, he made his UEFA Champions League debut in a 2–1 home defeat to German side RB Leipzig, continuing Benfica's record in the competition of having lost 11 times in the last 14 games. A 3-0 victory over Zenit Saint Petersburg in Benfica's final group stage game meant that Benfica finished in 3rd place and progressed to the Europa League, finishing above the Russian team by virtue of a superior head-to-head record. The victory ensured that Benfica "finished the Champions League campaign on a high, but there is a sense that they should have done better."

Following a win at Tondela on 27 October, Lage set the record for the quickest coach to record 25 victories in the Primeira Liga, having won 25 of his first 27 league matches and triumphing in every away game. Lage's Benfica would go on to win every away league game under him in 2019, having scored 42 goals in 15 games. In January 2020, Benfica set a new record for the number of consecutive wins away from home, having achieved victory 17 consecutive times since Lage had been appointed. This record was extended to 18 successive away wins after defeating Paços de Ferreira at Estádio da Mata Real, however the team's winning run was ended with a 3-2 defeat at Porto.

On 29 June 2020, Lage made his position available after equalising Benfica's worst ever series of results – 2 wins in 13 matches in the 2000–01 season – and establishing a record of 5 consecutive matches without a win at Estádio da Luz, which included defeats to Braga and Santa Clara. Lage's reign at Benfica was summarised as him having a strong record of managing his players and promoting youth, however players felt disengaged by training and Lage and the team had failed to adjust to the loss of João Félix.

He was replaced by his assistant coach Nélson Veríssimo on 30 June and had his contract terminated on 4 July that year.

Wolverhampton Wanderers

2021-22 season 
In June 2021, Lage was lined up to succeed compatriot Nuno Espírito Santo at Premier League club Wolverhampton Wanderers. He required a hearing for a work permit as he did not qualify automatically to work in Britain post-Brexit. The hearing was successful and, on 9 June, he was confirmed as the club's new head coach for the 2021-22 season. Lage's remit was described as "attacking football, fluid formations and developing youth" in addition to challenging for European football.

Lage's first signing for Wolves was winger Francisco Trincão, who joined the club on a season-long loan from Barcelona. Further additions were made to the first-team in the form of goalkeeper José Sá and the loan signing of Korean forward Hwang Hee-chan. Sá would go on to win Wolves' player of the season award that year after a string of impressive performances, and was credited for his sweeper keeper role which allowed Lage to adopt a strategy of building attacks from the back of defence.

On 14 August 2021, Wolves lost 1–0 away to Leicester City in Lage's first game. In his first home game at Molineux, Lage lost 1-0 to a Tottenham Hotspur side managed by Nuno Espírito Santo. He achieved his first win ten days later, a 4–0 victory at Nottingham Forest in the second round of the EFL Cup. Despite not winning any of their opening three league fixtures, Lage's side was praised for their attacking playing style, with supporters dubbing it "Bruno-ball". During pre-season, Lage had initially attempted to move Wolves away from the 3-4-3 system favoured by his predessor and deployed a 4-4-2 or 4-2-3-1, however he reverted to the five-man defence once the season started due to issues with the defence. Relying on the players favoured by Espírito Santo and adopting a similar style of play, Lage's first season was described as "evolution rather than revolution."

Lage got his first league win at the fourth attempt, a 2–0 win against Watford at Vicarage Road on 11 September. It took until Lage's fourth league game at home to record a win, a 2–1 success against Newcastle United on 2 October, with both Wolves strikes coming from Hwang Hee-chan. In the following game, Lage's team recorded their third successive victory by defeating local rivals Aston Villa 3-2 at Villa Park. Wolves had been 2-0 down in the 80th minute and became just the third team in Premier League history to a win a match after being two goals behind with ten minutes left of the match. Lage also equalled the club record of leading the side to three successive away victories in the Premier League. Wolves came close to winning four successive top-flight matches for the first time since 1972 in their next game, but conceded an injury-time penalty against Leeds United.

In the January transfer window Lage made one new signing, bringing in Portuguese winger Chiquinho. The loan transfer of Hwang Hee-chan was also made permanent. Lage won the Premier League Manager of the Month award for January after winning all three fixtures that month: 1-0 away at Manchester United, 2-1 at Brentford, and a 3-1 home win against Southampton.

Lage's FA Cup run ended in the fourth round with Wolves losing 1-0 at home to fellow Premier League side Norwich City, having defeated Sheffield United 3-0 in the third round.

A strong run over the winter months led to praise for what Lage had achieved in his time at Wolves with limited backing in the transfer market, and he was credited with getting an improvement out of younger players such as Rayan Aït-Nouri and Max Kilman. A 2-1 win against Leicester City on 20 February brought Wolves up to seventh place, with Wolves being tipped to battle for a place in European competition for the following season. Wolves were just six points behind fourth place and with two games in hand, leading to suggestions that Lage might lead his team to the Champions League places. From the fourth round of games Lage's team had taken 40 points from 21 games, the 4th-best total in the league. However, a late defeat away to fellow European challengers Arsenal in the next game caused Wolves to fall behind in the race for continental competition. Wolves had led until the 82nd minute thanks to a goal from Hwang Hee-chan but would go on to lose the match in injury-time. In a 2-0 home defeat to Crystal Palace, Lage subbed off young defender Ki-Jana Hoever after just twenty-five minutes with a suspected injury, remarking that "I don’t waste time who guys who don’t work hard."

On 18 March 2022, Wolves lost 3-2 at home to Leeds United despite leading 2-0 at half-time, with Leeds scoring three second-half goals after striker Raúl Jiménez was sent off. This started a run of just five points from the final nine games, with Lage's sole win in this run coming on 2 April against local rivals Aston Villa. Wolves did not win any of their final seven games, ultimately finishing the 2021-22 season in 10th place despite not having been lower than 8th since December 2021 prior to the final day. Wolves' final fourteen matches included nine defeats and just eleven points won, and although Lage had won away to opponents such as Aston Villa, Manchester United, and Tottenham Hotspur, his team had only scored more goals than the three relegated teams.

2022-23 season 
At the end of the previous season, Lage suggested that there would be a "natural transition" of the first-team. It was reported that Lage wanted to change the team's style of play, and that he "wants to play a higher line and wants his team to have more of the ball, to be more aggressive, to be quicker at the back, to be more athletic, tactically dynamic (ie, to play two systems, including four at the back) and be much better in duels." Throughout pre-season, Wolves consistently used a four-man defence, playing in a 4-3-3 or 4-2-3-1 formation as opposed to the five-man defence which had been used since Nuno Espírito Santo's time at the club, including throughout Lage's first season.

For the 2022-23 season, Lage oversaw a significant overhaul of the Wolves squad. Goalkeeper John Ruddy and defenders Marçal and Romain Saiss were released, with Ki-Jana Hoever and Fábio Silva both sent out on season-long loans. Club captain Conor Coady was also sent out on loan to Everton in order to facilitate Lage's desire to move to a four-man defence for which he felt Coady was unsuited. Despite starting the club's first two games, midfielder Morgan Gibbs-White was sold to Nottingham Forest and Willy Boly and Leander Dendoncker both left the club on deadline day. Centre-back Nathan Collins was signed from Burnley, followed by the arrivals of Portuguese duo Gonçalo Guedes and Matheus Nunes, the latter of whom was signed for a club record fee of £38m. Lage had previously coached Guedes as a youth player at the Benfica academy. Towards the end of the month Austrian striker Saša Kalajdžić also signed for Wolves, and on deadline day Boubacar Traoré joined the club on loan. Midfielder Ruven Neves was also retained despite speculation that he would be leaving Wolves. The club's transfer window was characterised as Lage reshaping the squad to his own desires; removing players that were perceived as being too used to the system of predessor Nuno Espírito Santo, and instead bringing in new players which were more suited to the new style of play which he wanted to implement. Lage explained that "I had the feeling... that the circle for some players had finished, that we needed to refresh the team." Wolves spent more than £100m in the summer transfer window, and The Athletic argued that "Lage has been backed... Wolves have transformed their squad completely. Lage called it "the team we were dreaming of" and stated his belief that it was a "new chapter" for his side.

On 6 August in Wolves' first game of the season, Lage utilised the four-man defence which the team had been practicing in pre-season for the first time, but his team lost 2-1 away to Leeds United despite initially taking a 1-0 lead. In the club's second game, a point was secured at home to Fulham after a late penalty save by José Sá. After a loss away to Tottenham Hotspur, an injury-time equaliser for Newcastle United on 28 August denied Wolves their first league win of the season. Lage's team was booed off after a 0-0 draw away to managerless Bournemouth who had lost their previous game 9-0. The draw meant that Wolves had not won in any of their previous twelve league games. The win arrived in the following match, beating Southampton 1-0 at home on 3 September. The victory against Southampton was marred by an injury to Raúl Jiménez in the warm-up, and new signing Saša Kalajdžić was forced off at half-time with an injury on his debut. With news that Kalajdžić would be out for a significant length of time due to an ACL tear leaving Wolves without a fit senior striker, Lage signed free agent Diego Costa on 12 September.

Following a 3-0 loss at home to champions Manchester City in the club's next game it was reported that Lage's job was at risk. On 2 October, after a defeat to West Ham United, Lage and his coaching staff were sacked, with the club 18th in the league. Wolves had scored just three goals, the lowest tally in the league. Tensions in the dressing room were later reported as a reason for Lage's removal alongside the results. The Athletic said that "Lage fell short in his quest to transform the club’s style of play... There were moments of encouragement and promises of exciting football but Lage’s reign will go down in Wolves history as a failure." After his dismissal, Lage defended his time at the club on social media, arguing that the team "never lost a match with a striker in the initial line-up, [and] will surely improve as strikers become available."

Lage was initially replaced by under-18s coach Steve Davis on an interim basis, before ultimately being succeeded on a permanent basis by Julen Lopetegui on 14 November.

Personal life
Lage's son, Jaime (born April 2015), is named after Jaime Graça, Lage's biggest influence in football, as a mentor. Lage's younger brother, Luís Nascimento, is also a coach.

Managerial statistics

Honours
Benfica
 Primeira Liga: 2018–19
 Supertaça Cândido de Oliveira: 2019
Individual
 Primeira Liga's Best Coach: 2018–19
 Portuguese Football Federation men's coach of the year: 2019
Premier League Manager of the Month: January 2022

Notes

References

External links

 

1976 births
Living people
Sportspeople from Setúbal
Portuguese footballers
Association football midfielders
Portuguese football managers
S.L. Benfica non-playing staff
Sheffield Wednesday F.C. non-playing staff
Swansea City A.F.C. non-playing staff
S.L. Benfica B managers
S.L. Benfica managers
Wolverhampton Wanderers F.C. managers
Liga Portugal 2 managers
Primeira Liga managers
Premier League managers
Portuguese expatriate football managers
Portuguese expatriate sportspeople in England
Portuguese expatriate sportspeople in Wales
Portuguese expatriate sportspeople in the United Arab Emirates
Expatriate football managers in England
Expatriate football managers in Wales
Expatriate football managers in the United Arab Emirates